Charles de Souza Gavin (born July 9, 1960) is a Brazilian drummer and music producer, perhaps best known for his 25-year tenure with rock band Titãs. Before Titãs, he had brief stints at Ira! and RPM.

Early life and first works 
At age 8, his friends invited him to participate on the September 7 (Brazil's Independence Day) festival. The problem was the absence of decent percussion instruments. So, the school decided to improvise these with kitchen utensils. But there was still an instrument remaining, which would be quite difficult for a not so skillful drummer to play. Gavin, who was already used to beat the table at school, was chosen for the job. The band, commanded by Gavin, won the originality prize.

In 1975, at the year of 15, living in Jabaquara, Gavin joined ten neighbors, and during the weeks that preceded the Carnaval, they promoted noisy beats around the streets. However, his ears were focused on the discs of Led Zeppelin, Black Sabbath and Emerson, Lake & Palmer. Once the drumming life was chosen, he built himself his first own drum kit, using pieces of his father's Opala, his sofa, and two ash trays.

In 1979, when he was 19, Gavin convinced his father to buy his first true drum kit, a white Pinguim. The condition to keep the instrument was not to quit college, though. In 1982, Gavin entered administration at the Ponthifical Catholic University of São Paulo, while working at Panasonic, operating huge computers.

During his studies at PUC, he entered the band Zero Hora, and later the bands Santa Gang, Zona Franca and Os Jetsons, the latter together with Branco Mello and Ciro Pessoa, members of Titãs, the band he would join in 1985. Also with Ciro, he performed with Cabine C, but with Ira! he made more shows, and caught Titãs's attention.

Gavin cites Stewart Copeland, Neil Peart, Ginger Baker and John Bonham as some of his influences.

Career with Titãs 
On 25 December 1984, when he had already switched Ira! for RPM (he made it to release a two-track single with the group but left before the release of their first album), he was invited to join Titãs by vocalist Mello and keyboardist/vocalist Sérgio Britto. André Jung, who left Titãs, would replace Gavin at Ira!. Gavin left his triple life and dedicated himself only to music. In 1985, he made his debut with the band and entered the studio to record their second album, Televisão. He left Titãs in 2010.

Other projects 
One of his main activities is to collect rare LPs. Gavin transformed this hobby in a second activity, Titãs being the first one. He re-released discs from artists like Tom Zé, Lady Zu and Novos Baianos, beyond organizing compilations for labels. Since the end of the 1980s, he has been also producing. His first production work was the album "Vítimas do Sistema", from the Brazilian band Detrito Federal, in 1988.

In 2007, he released his first book, called 300 Discos Importantes da Música Brasileira (300 Important Albums of the Brazilian Music).

Personal life 
Married to the dancer Mariana Roquette-Pinto (who was once kidnapped in Rio de Janeiro and, after four days, rescued by the local police, in a period both were still only dating each other), Gavin had two daughters with her: Dora, born in 2003, and Sofia, born in September 2005.

Discography

With Titãs 

Titãs (1984)
Televisão (1985)
Cabeça Dinossauro (1986)
Jesus não Tem Dentes no País dos Banguelas (1987)
Õ Blésq Blom (1989)
Tudo Ao Mesmo Tempo Agora (1991)
Titanomaquia (1993)
Domingo (1995)
Volume Dois (1998)
As Dez Mais (1999)
A Melhor Banda de Todos os Tempos da Última Semana (2001)
Como Estão Vocês? (2003)
Sacos Plásticos (2009)

with Ira! 
 Ira! (1984)

with RPM 
 RPM (1984)

As a producer 
 Vítimas do Milagre (1987) - Detrito Federal
 Vange (1991) - Vange Leonel
 Moleque de Rua (1993) - Moleque de Rua
 Samba Esquema Noise (1995) - Mundo Livre S/A
 Ronaldo e os Impedidos (1996) - Ronaldo e os Impedidos
 Heart & Soul (1996) - Blues Solon Fishbone y Los Cobras

Guest appearances as a drummer

Som Livre Masters series
Record label Som Livre commissioned Gavin to select 25 rare albums for inclusion in their Som Livre Masters Series of CD reissues.

The albums:

Sambas - Don Junior, Walter Wanderley, Milton Banana
Bossa nova, nova bossa - Manfredo Fest
Bossa Jazz Trio - Bossa Jazz Trio
Sansa Trio - Sansa Trio
Os Brazões - Os Brazões
Em Som Maior - Sambrasa Trio
Sambossa 5
Quarteto Bossamba - Walter Wanderley
Reencontro com Sambalanço Trio  - Sambalanço Trio
Som 3 - Cesar Camargo Mariano
Os Sambistas - Paulinho da Viola
Decisão - Zimbo Trio
Brazilian Octopus - Hermeto Pascoal
Com Dizia O Poeta - Vinicius de Moraes, Marília Medalha, Toquinho
 E deixa o relógio andar - Osmar Milito
Rosinha de Valença - Rosinha de Valença
Molhado de Suor  - Alceu Valença
Vila Sésamo
 Vamos pro Mundo - Novos Baianos
Gerson Conrad e Zezé Motta
Sítio do Picapau Amarelo
Tim Maia - Tim Maia
Vontade De Rever Você - Marcos Valle
Nave Maria - Tom Zé
Línguas de Fogo - Sidney Miller

References

External links
Titãs official website
 
 Gavin's page at Titãs official web site 

1960 births
Living people
Brazilian drummers
Brazilian songwriters
Brazilian people of French descent
Brazilian composers
Brazilian rock musicians
Musicians from São Paulo
Titãs members
Brazilian record producers